Aiguille de Leschaux (3,759 m) is a mountain in the Mont Blanc massif on the border of Haute-Savoie, France and Aosta Valley, Italy.

Located on the eastern side of the Mont Blanc massif on the ridge between Mont Dolent and Grandes Jorasses, the mountain is usually climbed from Val Ferret on the Italian side. The nearest town is Courmayeur.

References 

Mountains of the Graian Alps
Mountains of Haute-Savoie
Mountains of Aosta Valley
Alpine three-thousanders
France–Italy border
International mountains of Europe